The João Belo class, also known as Comandante João Belo class, is a class of four frigates of French design, based on the  but fitted for tropical service. Ordered by the Portuguese Navy in 1964, the four ships of this class were constructed at the shipyard in Nantes, France between 1965 and 1967. The first ship entered Portuguese service in 1967. The frigates were used for ocean patrol of Portuguese colonies and later, joined NATO's STANAVFORLANT unit. The first unit was discarded in 2003, followed by a second in 2004. The final two ships were taken out of service in 2008 sold to the Uruguayan Navy. The third ship was discarded in 2021, with one ship remaining in service.

Background
After World War II, Portugal retained much of its colonial empire. However, beginning in 1961, the Portuguese colonial empire saw unrest and invasion. This led Portugal to increase the number of ships capable of operating in colonial waters. Portugal was then forced to buy frigates of an already existing project due to the urgency in the acquisition of naval ships for the defense of African, Macanese and Timorese waters.

Description and design
Based on the French , the João Belo class was designed for coastal patrol and convoy escort duty. However, due to their planned use in Portuguese colonies in the Pacific and African regions, they had additional equipment installed for tropical service. The frigates were propelled by two shafts powered by four SEMT Pielstick V12 PC diesel engines creating . The ships had a crew of 214.

The ships initially mounted three Creusot Loire /55 calibre Mod 1953 naval guns in single mounts placed on the centreline in positions "A", "X", and "Y". The frigates also sported two Bofors /60 guns in a twin turret situated in the "B" position on the centreline. The 100 mm guns could fire a  shell  at 80° elevation. The 40 mm guns could fire a  shell  at 90° elevation. For anti-submarine warfare (ASW), the João Belo class were equipped with a single Mortier four-barrelled  anti-submarine mortar with a range of  firing a  projectile and two triple-mounted  ASW torpedo tubes for LCAN L3 torpedoes.

The João Belo class mounted Thomson-CSF DRBV 22A air search radar operating on the D band, and Thomson-CSF DR8V 50 surface search radar operating on the G band. For fire control radar, they mounted Thomson-CSF DRBC 31D radar operating on the I band and ARBR10 radar warning. For ASW, they had a hull-mounted EDO SQS-17A attack sonar coupled with a Thomson Sintra DU8A 3A search sonar.

Modifications
In 1989, the frigates had two Loral Hycor Mk 36 SRBOC six-barrelled chaff launchers installed. The frigates underwent significant modernization beginning in 1993. The "X" turret was removed along with the anti-submarine mortar. The João Belos received a new SQS-510 hull-mounted sonar, the AR-700(V2) intercept ESM replaced the ARBR10. The torpedo tubes were upgraded to the US Mk 32 torpedo tubes Mod 5 firing Honeywell Mk 46 torpedoes. Furthermore, they received the SLQ-25 Nixie towed torpedo decoy system. They had a crew of 164 including 15 officers.

Ships

Construction and career
The four frigates of the class were ordered from the French shipyard Ateliers et chantiers de Bretagne (ACB) Nantes, with construction of the first ship beginning in 1965. Three more ships followed with construction ending in 1968 with the commissioning of the final ship in 1968. Comandante João Belo was the first ship to enter service and was sent on a mission to Bissau in January 1968. This was followed by a nearly year-long overseas deployment which involved monitoring the British blockade of Beira, Mozambique. In 1972, Comandante João Belo was among the Portuguese warships that sailed to Brazil for the nation's 150th anniversary of its independence. In 1974 Comandante Roberto Ivens was among the Portuguese ships that was sent to Luanda as part of decolonization efforts there.

Comandante João Belo deployed to NATO's STANAVFORLANT unit in 1983, 1984 and 1986. Comandante Roberto Ivens was assigned to STANAVFORLANT in 1985, 1989 and 1991. Comandante Hermenegildo Capelo was the first Portuguese warship to incorporate female crew. On 16 May 2003,  Comandante Roberto Ivens was stricken from the naval register and cannibalised for spare parts. In 2004, Comandante Hermenegildo Capelo was stricken from service. Comandante Hermenegildo Capelo was chosen as a hull for the "Ocean Revival" program and stripped and decontaminated.

Comandante João Belo was taken out of service in March 2008. Comandante João Belo and Comandante Sacadura Cabral were sold to the Uruguayan Navy in April 2008, becoming, respectively ROU Uruguay and ROU Pedro Campbell. Pedro Campbell was taken out service by Uruguay and cannibalized for parts. The vessel was sold for scrap in 2021.

See also 
 Portuguese Colonial War

Notelist

Citations

Sources

External links
 

 
Frigates of the Portuguese Navy
Frigate classes